The population of amphibians of Madagascar is made up exclusively of frogs.
There are 311 named species of frogs on Madagascar, but several hundred have been identified using DNA barcoding and remain to be formally described.

Native described species belong to four different families: Hyperoliidae (11 species), Mantellidae (212 species), Microhylidae (86 species) and Ranidae (1 species). Two further species are introduced: the ranid frog Hoplobatrachus tigrinus and the toad Duttaphrynus melanostictus. Almost all native species are endemic, with the exception of Ptychadena mascareniensis. 85 species are threatened with extinction, nine of which are considered by the IUCN as critically endangered. Their numbers are largely affected by major alterations of habitat due to deforestation and the expansion of paddy fields and villages, and to a lesser extent, by illegal international trade.

Hyperoliidae

Mantellidae

Microhylidae

Ranidae

References

 
Madagascar
Amphibians
Madagascar